Angélica María Blandón Gallo (born c. 1983) is a Colombian actress. She is best known for her roles in the 2008 film  and telenovelas such as The Mafia Dolls and 3 milagros.

Biography
Angélica Blandón was born in Colombia in the 1980s. She took an interest in acting at a young age. She studied at the Efraín Arce Aragón Academy in Medellín for five years, at the Colombian Theater Corporation, and at the Superior Academy of Art in Bogotá. Later she would move with her family to New York.

Shortly afterward, she became part of the Rapsoda group of the Corporación Colombiana de Teatro, directed by Patricia Ariza. There she acted in the play Guadalupe años sin cuenta. She then appeared on the telenovela . In 2009, she played the protagonist Brenda on the telenovela The Mafia Dolls.

In theater, she has appeared in the plays Poses para dormir, El club del tropel, La bella durmiente, En el cielo también hay paisas, Los guardianes de la paz, Borges, and Cartera.

In 2007, she received the Best Actress award at the Bogotá Film Festival for the film .

Personal life
Blandón married musician Nicolás Ospina, and they had a daughter together in 2007. In 2012, she began a new relationship with photographic director Lukas Kristo, and in 2020 she announced that she was pregnant with their first child.

She was the center of controversy in March 2021 when, in reaction to an incident in which a Bogotá police officer was killed, she posted to Instagram, "Well, good, it has been a long time since we received such news. A policeman, serving his uniform, usually tries to avoid arriving before the criminals have left." She later added, "My condolences to the family of this brave policeman. Bogotá, I hope that you will recover soon from this wave of insecurity that assails you in all possible ways."

Filmography

Television

Film

Notes

References

External links

 

1980s births
Colombian stage actresses
Colombian telenovela actresses
Living people